Sredorek is a village in Treklyano Municipality, Kyustendil Province, south-western Bulgaria. As of end of 2013, its population was 43.

References

Villages in Kyustendil Province